The Șes is a left tributary of the river Pârâul de Câmpie in Romania. It discharges into the Pârâul de Câmpie in Bujor.

References

Rivers of Romania
Rivers of Mureș County